In mathematics, Kruskal's tree theorem states that the set of finite trees over a well-quasi-ordered set of labels is itself well-quasi-ordered under homeomorphic embedding.

History
It has since become a prominent example in reverse mathematics as a statement that cannot be proved within ATR0 (a form of arithmetical transfinite recursion),  and a finitary application of the theorem gives the existence of the fast-growing TREE function.

In 2004, the result was generalized from trees to graphs as the Robertson–Seymour theorem, a result that has also proved important in reverse mathematics and leads to the even-faster-growing SSCG function which dwarfs TREE(3).

Statement
The version given here is that proven by Nash-Williams; Kruskal's formulation is somewhat stronger. All trees we consider are finite.

Take  to be a partially ordered set.

Weak tree function
Define , the weak tree function, as the length of the longest sequence of 1-labelled trees (i.e. ) such that:

 The tree at position  in the sequence has no more than  vertices, for all .
 No tree is homeomorphically embeddable into any tree following it in the sequence.

To differentiate the two functions, TREE with all letters capitalized is the big TREE function; tree with all letters in lowercase is the weak tree function.

Friedman's work
For a countable label set , Kruskal's tree theorem can be expressed and proven using second-order arithmetic. However, like Goodstein's theorem or the Paris–Harrington theorem, some special cases and variants of the theorem can be expressed in subsystems of second-order arithmetic much weaker than the subsystems where they can be proved. This was first observed by Harvey Friedman in the early 1980s, an early success of the then-nascent field of reverse mathematics. In the case where the trees above are taken to be unlabeled (that is, in the case where  has order one), Friedman found that the result was unprovable in ATR0, thus giving the first example of a predicative result with a provably impredicative proof. This case of the theorem is still provable by Π-CA0, but by adding a "gap condition" to the definition of the order on trees above, he found a natural variation of the theorem unprovable in this system. Much later, the Robertson–Seymour theorem would give another theorem unprovable by Π-CA0.

Ordinal analysis confirms the strength of Kruskal's theorem, with the proof-theoretic ordinal of the theorem equaling the small Veblen ordinal (sometimes confused with the smaller Ackermann ordinal).

TREE(3)
Suppose that P(n) is the statement:

There is some m such that if T1,...,Tm is a finite sequence of unlabeled rooted trees where Tk has n+k vertices, then Ti ≤ Tj for some i < j.

All the statements P(n) are true as a consequence of Kruskal's theorem and Kőnig's lemma. For each n, Peano arithmetic can prove that P(n) is true, but Peano arithmetic cannot prove the statement "P(n) is true for all n".  Moreover the length of the shortest proof of P(n) in Peano arithmetic grows phenomenally fast as a function of n, far faster than any primitive recursive function or the Ackermann function for example. The least m for which P(n) holds similarly grows extremely quickly with n.

By incorporating labels, Friedman defined a far faster-growing function. For a positive integer n, take TREE(n) to be the largest m so that we have the following:

There is a sequence T1,...,Tm of rooted trees labelled from a set of n labels, where each Ti has at most i vertices, such that Ti  ≤  Tj does not hold for any i < j  ≤ m.

The TREE sequence begins TREE(1) = 1, TREE(2) = 3, then suddenly TREE(3) explodes to a value that is so big that many other "large" combinatorial constants, such as Friedman's n(4), nn(5)(5), and Graham's Number,  are extremely small by comparison. . A lower bound for n(4), and hence an extremely weak lower bound for TREE(3), is AA(187196)(1), where A(x) taking one argument, is defined as A(x, x), where A(k, n), taking two arguments, is a particular version of Ackermann's function defined as: A(1, n) = 2n, A(k+1, 1) = A(k, 1), A(k+1, n+1) = A(k, A(k+1, n)). Graham's number, for example, is much smaller than the lower bound AA(187196)(1). It can be shown that the growth-rate of the function TREE is at least  in the fast-growing hierarchy. Using finite arithmetic, the amount of symbols needed to prove TREE(3) is finite is 2↑↑1000 .

See also
Paris–Harrington theorem
Kanamori–McAloon theorem
Robertson–Seymour theorem

Notes
 Friedman originally denoted this function by TR[n].
 n(k) is defined as the length of the longest possible sequence that can be constructed with a k-letter alphabet such that no block of letters xi,...,x2i is a subsequence of any later block xj,...,x2j. .

References
Citations

Bibliography

 

Mathematical logic
Order theory
Theorems in discrete mathematics
Trees (graph theory)
Wellfoundedness